Lieutenant Joseph Petrosino Square is small triangular park in lower Manhattan in New York City, bounded by Cleveland Place and Lafayette and Kenmare Streets, two blocks north of the old police headquarters at 240 Centre Street, at the juncture of the Little Italy, Nolita, and SoHo neighborhoods. Formerly Kenmare Square, it changed its name in 1987 in honor of Lieutenant Joseph Petrosino, an early 20th century NYPD official dedicated to investigating and combating, among other adversaries, the Black Hand, an early version of the Mafia in America.

The park underwent a $2 million renovation in 2008–2011, and is the site of a controversial CitiBike docking station.

References

Squares in Manhattan
Parks in Manhattan
Nolita
SoHo, Manhattan